The South Manchuria Railway Zone or SMR Zone, was the area of Japanese extraterritorial rights in northeast China, in connection with the operation of the South Manchurian Railway.

History
Following the Japanese victory in 1905 over Imperial Russia in the Russo-Japanese War and the signing of the Treaty of Portsmouth, the South Manchuria branch (from Changchun to Lüshun) of the China Far East Railway was transferred to Japanese control. Japan claimed that this control included all the rights and privileges granted to Russia by China in the Li-Lobanov Treaty of 1896, as enlarged by the Kwantung Lease Agreement of 1898, which included absolute and exclusive administration within the railway zone. 

The Zone was geographically a 62 m wide strip of land on either side of the South Manchurian Railway tracks, extending along the 700 km main trunk route from Dalian to Changchun, the 260 km Mukden to Antung route, and four other spur routes, for a total length of 1100 km and a total land area of 250 km². The rail lines connected 25 cities and towns, and within each town, the zone included warehouses, repair shops, coal mines and electrical facilities that were deemed necessary to maintain the trains. 

Japan stationed railway guards to provide security for the trains and tracks throughout the zone, but they were regular Japanese soldiers and frequently carried on maneuvers outside the railway areas. In addition, Japan also maintained Consular Police attached to the Japanese consulates and branch consulates in major cities as Harbin, Tsitsihar, and Manchowli as well as in the Chientao District in which lived large numbers of ethnic Koreans. 

In 1915, Japan presented to China the Twenty-One Demands, resulting in the Sino-Japanese Treaty of 1915. It provided that Japanese subjects would be free to reside and travel in South Manchuria, and engage in business and manufacture of any kind and lease land that was necessary for erecting suitable buildings for trade, manufacturing, and agricultural enterprises. Japan loosely interpreted that to include most of Manchuria in the term "South Manchuria."

After the foundation of Manchukuo, with full Japanese control over all of Manchuria, the zone ceased to have a function and was abolished in 1937.

References

External links
 INTERNATIONAL MILITARY TRIBUNAL FOR THE FAR EAST Judgement, Chapter III

Notes

1906 establishments in China
1906 establishments in the Japanese colonial empire
1937 disestablishments in China
1937 disestablishments in Japan
Foreign relations of the Empire of Japan
Japanese colonial empire
History of Manchuria
Kwantung Army
Kwantung Leased Territory
Rail transport in Manchukuo